Asraruddin Putra Omar (26 March 1988) is a Malaysian footballer who is a former defender for Selangor F.C., last played Penang F.C. for the 2017 season. He also a member of Malaysia national, Malaysia U-23 and former Malaysia U-20 squad. He was the team captain of Selangor F.C. for the 2013 season. Now he played as the captain of Kelana United. Kelana United played in the Subang Football League for the 2021 season.

Career
Asraruddin, a leftback in the Malaysia U-19 for 2007 Champions Youth Cup, is the team's vice-skipper and took over the captain's armband from the injured Mohd Bunyamin Umar in the match against PSV.

In November 2007, Mohd Asraruddin Putra Omar were given a trials with Dutch club PSV Eindhoven which lasted for a week. PSV Eindhoven were impressed with the duo after watching them in action in the Champions Youth Cup, hosted by Malaysia in August 2007. Capable of playing in either the leftback or centreback positions, the former student at the Bukit Jalil Sports School helped Malaysia qualify for the AFC Under-20 Championship for the first time in over 20 years.

Asraruddin made his under 23 debut against Republic of Ireland on 15 May 2008 and his international senior debut against India on 22 July 2008 as a substitute. He also represent the Malaysia XI squad against Chelsea F.C. at Shah Alam Stadium on 29 July 2008. The Malaysia XI eventually lost 0–2.

Outside Football
Asra has his own barbershop, Piratas Barber Shop, located in Puncak Alam. Asra cited that he not think about to hanging up his boot, for now he focused on to recover from knee injury whilst make end meets at his barbershop.

Honours

Club
Selangor
 Malaysian Charity Shield (2) : 2009, 2010
 Malaysia Super League (2) : 2009, 2010
 Malaysia FA Cup (1) : 2009

Johor Darul Takzim
 Malaysian Charity Shield: 2015
 Malaysia Super League (3) : 2014,  2015,2016
 Malaysia Cup :2014 
 AFC Cup : 2015

International
Malaysia National Team
 AFF Suzuki Cup : 2010
Malaysia U23
 Southeast Asian Games (2) : 2009, 2011

References

1988 births
Malaysian footballers
Malaysia international footballers
Living people
People from Selangor
Selangor FA players
Johor Darul Ta'zim F.C. players
Malaysia Super League players
Association football defenders
Footballers at the 2010 Asian Games
Southeast Asian Games gold medalists for Malaysia
Southeast Asian Games medalists in football
Competitors at the 2011 Southeast Asian Games
Asian Games competitors for Malaysia